Tin Taralle volcanic field is a volcanic field in the Aïr region of Niger, which covers a surface area of . It was active during the Pleistocene, with eruptive episodes between 28-20, 15-8 and 4 to 0.7 million years ago. The field consists of cinder cones which have mostly erupted basalt but also phonolite and trachyte.

References

Sources 

 

Volcanic fields
Pleistocene volcanoes
Volcanoes of Africa